Confessor of the Faith is a title given by some Christian denominations.

Etymology
The word confessor is derived from the Latin confiteri, to confess, to profess. Among the early church fathers, it was a title of honor, designating those individuals who had confessed Christ publicly in time of persecution and had been punished with imprisonment, torture, exile, or labour in the mines, remaining faithful until the end of their lives. The title thus distinguished them from the martyrs, who were those that had undergone death for their faith. Among writers, St. Cyprian is the first in whose works it occurs.

Western Christianity
In the Roman Catholic Church, the title is given to saints and blesseds who were not martyred. Historically, the title Confessor was given to those who had suffered persecution and torture for the faith but not to the point of martyrdom. As Christianity emerged as the dominant religion in Europe by the fifth century, persecutions became rare, and the title was given to male saints who lived a holy life and died in peace. Perhaps the best-known individual associated with the title is the English king St. Edward the Confessor. It is possible for Confessors to have another title or even two other titles, for example, Bishop and Confessor; Pope and Confessor; or Bishop, Confessor, and Doctor of the Church, among others: St. Jerome is known as Priest, Confessor, Theologian, Historian and Doctor of the Church.

Eastern Christianity
In the Eastern Orthodox Church, the title Confessor refers to a saint (male or female) who has witnessed to the faith and suffered for it (usually torture, but also other types of loss), but not to the point of death, and thus is distinguished from a martyr. Nikephoros I of Constantinople, who was banished to the monastery of Saint Theodore for his support of iconodules, is revered as a confessor. A confessor who is also a priest or bishop may be referred to as hiero-confessor.

See also

List of Confessors
List of Eastern Orthodox saint titles
Martyr of charity, one who dies as a result of charitable acts but not from persecution.
Passion-bearer
Virgin (title)

References

Citations

Sources 

 

Christian saints
Types of saints
Groups of Roman Catholic saints